Gilvan Santos Souza (born 20 April 1977), known as Rincón, is a Brazilian footballer who plays for Santa Clara.

Rincón scored 18 goals for Paços de Ferreira to win promotion to Portuguese Liga. He scored 5 goals in 20 league matches for Marítimo at Portuguese Liga 2005–06 before back to Brazil.

In mid-2007, he returned to Portugal for Liga de Honra side Vizela.

Honours
Liga de Honra: 2005

External links 
 Brazilian FA Contract archive 
 Profile at Portuguese Liga 

Brazilian footballers
Brazilian expatriate footballers
Santa Cruz Futebol Clube players
C.S. Marítimo players
Gil Vicente F.C. players
F.C. Paços de Ferreira players
C.D. Santa Clara players
Primeira Liga players
Expatriate footballers in Portugal
Association football forwards
Sportspeople from Bahia
1977 births
Living people